This is a list of the top-selling albums in New Zealand for 2016 from the Official New Zealand Music Chart's end-of-year chart, compiled by Recorded Music NZ. This list also shows top 20 albums in New Zealand.

Chart
Key
 – Album of New Zealand origin

Top 20 Albums by New Zealand artists

References

External links 
 The Official NZ Music Chart - albums

2016 in New Zealand music
2016 record charts
Albums 2016